Sleepy Eye Creek is a  tributary of the Cottonwood River of Minnesota, the United States.  Via the Cottonwood River, its water flows to the Minnesota River and eventually the Mississippi River.

Sleepy Eye Creek was named for Chief Sleepy Eye.

See also
List of rivers of Minnesota

References

External links
Minnesota Watersheds
USGS Hydrologic Unit Map - State of Minnesota (1974)

Rivers of Brown County, Minnesota
Rivers of Redwood County, Minnesota
Rivers of Minnesota
Tributaries of the Mississippi River